Hokandara is a suburb of Colombo.

It sits astride the Hokandara-Kottawa Road and the Malabe-Aturugiriya (Borella) Road.

Originally a working-class and farming area, since the 1990s Hokandara has become an increasingly upper-middle and  middle-class residential area. 

Sub areas such as Arangala, Everihena, Wellangiriya and Horahena belongs to Hokandara.

History
The Rajavaliya mentions that King Rajasinghe I levied troops from Hokandara, prior to the Battle of Mulleriyawa in 1561.
An Area which highly agriculture is done .

Local facilities 
 Supermarkets - Keells Super - Arangala , Dickland lands; Cargills Food City & LAUGFS supermarket - Hokandara Junction; Cargills Food City Express - Arangala and Samagi Mawatha, Co-op Food City - Hokandara South; 
 Banks - (People's Bank)
 ATM's - Commercial Bank, Sampath Bank
 Petrol sheds - Arangala (Ceypetco) & Hokandara - Wanaguru Mawatha (Lanka IOC)
 Schools - (Vidura College - Colombo - Thalawathugoda Campus, Hokandara Vidyaraja Maha Vidyalaya), Hokandara Vidayaloka Vidyalaya.
 Road Connectivity - Athurugiriya Highway Entrance (OCH - Outer Colombo Highway)
 Bus Routes - 689 (Hokandara - Nugegoda), 993 (Malabe- Maharagama), 336 ( Malabe - Kottawa), 170 (Athurugiriya - Fort), 190 (Godagama/Meegoda - Fort), 17/255 (Panadura - Kandy), 336/1 (Kottawa - Malabe-via Horahena), 994 (Maharagama - Hokandara)
 Thalangama lake which has a beautiful environment which makes the home to various species of animals .

Postal structure
The area is served by the Hokandara Post Office. It is divided into four postal subdivisions - north, east, south and west.

 Populated places in Western Province, Sri Lanka